Chalfants is an unincorporated community in Perry County, in the U.S. state of Ohio.

History
Chalfants had its start around 1871 when the railroad was extended to that point. A post office called Chalfants was established in 1877, and remained in operation until 1932.

References

Unincorporated communities in Perry County, Ohio
Unincorporated communities in Ohio
1871 establishments in Ohio